Zagheh-ye Anuch (also Romanized as Zāgheh-ye Anūch and Zāgheh Anūch; also known as Zāgheh-ye Anūj) is a village in Sefidkuh Rural District, Samen District, Malayer County, Hamadan Province, Iran. At the 2006 census, its population was 125, in 39 families.

References 

Populated places in Malayer County